Dry House Creek is a stream in the U.S. state of South Dakota.

Dry House Creek was named for the fact buffalo meat was dried near it in a dryhouse.

See also
List of rivers of South Dakota

References

Rivers of Harding County, South Dakota
Rivers of South Dakota